The 2012 Men's VISA International Hockey Tournament was a men's field hockey tournament, consisting of a series of test matches. It was held in London, United Kingdom, from May 2 to 6, 2012. The tournament served as a test event for the field hockey tournament at the 2012 Summer Olympics. The tournament featured four of the top nations in women's field hockey.

Germany won the tournament after defeating Australia 5–2 in the final. Great Britain finished in third place after defeating India 2–1 in the third place playoff.

Competition format
The tournament featured the national teams of Australia, Germany, India, and the hosts, Great Britain, competing in a round-robin format, with each team playing each other once. Three points were awarded for a win, one for a draw, and none for a loss.

^ Includes results representing West Germany.* Includes results representing England.

Results

Pool Stage

Classification matches

Third and fourth place

Final

Statistics

Final standings

Goalscorers

References

Field hockey